Black Butterfly is a 2006 Peruvian drama film directed by Francisco Lombardi. The screenplay was written by Giovanna Pollarolo based on the novel of Alonso Cueto.

Cast
Darío Abad as Guido Pazos
Gustavo Bueno as Osmán
Montserrat Carulla	 as Pilar	
Yvonne Frayssinet as Dotty
Lluís Homar as Mar
Ricardo Morán as Ramón
Liliana Trujillo as Aida
Magdyel Ugaz as Ángela
Melania Urbina as Gabriela

Awards and nominations

Won
Málaga Spanish Film Festival
Best Latin American Actress (Melania Urbina)

Nominated
Goya Awards
Best Spanish Language Foreign Film (lost to XXY)

Montréal Film Festival
Grand Prix des Amériques (lost to O Maior Amor do Mundo and Nagai sanpo)

External links

2006 films
Films directed by Francisco José Lombardi
2000s Peruvian films
2000s Spanish-language films
Peruvian drama films